"In My Pocket" is a song by American singer Mandy Moore for her self-titled second studio album. It was released on May 1, 2001, by Epic Records as the lead single from the record. The song was written by Randall Barlow, Emilio Estefan, Liza Quintana, and Gian Marco Zignago and produced by Estefan and Barlow. 

Opening to mixed reviews from music critics, "In My Pocket" instantly entered the top 30 in Australia and New Zealand. In the United States, the single received little success, failing to chart on the Billboard Hot 100. However, it debuted at number two on the Bubbling Under Hot 100 Singles.

Critical reception
"In My Pocket" received mixed reviews from music critics. Slant Magazine's Sal Cinquemani gave the song a positive review, favoring its departure from Moore's previous singles and calling it "home to one of the best pop hooks in recent memory" and stating that the lyrics were "far more penetrating than anything on her peers' plates." Entertainment Weekly's Matt Diehl, however, gave it a C rating, stating his disturbance at "hearing the 17-year-old moaning, 'How much for your love?'" Diehl was also unhappy with its lyrical content, relating that "lyrics that dance around naughtiness... devolve into nonsense." People magazine said that it was "laced with sinewy Middle Eastern rhythms... just as right for the summer."

Chart performance
"In My Pocket" charted on the Bubbling Under Hot 100 Singles chart peaking at number two. To date, "In My Pocket" has sold 11,000 physical copies and 210,000 paid digital downloads according to Nielsen Soundscan. The song performed fairly well internationally in countries like Australia, where it reached number 11.

Music video

TRL premiered the song's music video on April 20, 2001. It was directed by Matthew Rolston.

Track listings

European CD1
 "In My Pocket" (album version) – 3:38
 "In My Pocket" (Brandnew radio mix) – 3:28

European CD2
 "In My Pocket" (album version) – 3:38
 "In My Pocket" (Brandnew radio mix) – 3:28
 "In My Pocket" (Hex Hector main 7-inch mix) – 3:21
 "In My Pocket" (Thunderpuss club mix—vox up) – 9:53
 "In My Pocket" (video version)

Australian CD single
 "In My Pocket" (album version) – 3:38
 "I Wanna Be with You" (live on MTV) – 3:28
 "In My Pocket" (Hex Hector main 7-inch mix) – 3:21
 "In My Pocket" (Thunderpuss club mix—vox up) – 9:53

Charts

Weekly charts

Year end charts

Certifications

Release history

References

2000 songs
2001 singles
Mandy Moore songs
Music videos directed by Matthew Rolston
Songs written by Emilio Estefan
Songs written by Gian Marco